TGSCOM, Inc. was an American online gun dealer based in Green Bay, Wisconsin which sold guns and sporting goods through more than 150 websites, including thegunsource.com and topglock.com.  TGSCOM was founded in Arizona in 1999 by Eric Thompson, and was based in Tempe, Arizona until October 2006 when the operation was moved to Green Bay. TGSCOM is no longer in business as of May 20, 2012.

Media attention 
TGSCOM sold weapons and/or accessories to George Sodini, the alleged shooter in the 2009 LA Fitness shooting; Steven Kazmierczak, perpetrator of the 2008 Northern Illinois University shooting; and Seung-Hui Cho, the perpetrator of the 2007 Virginia Tech massacre. In August 2009, it employed 37 people; in 2007, at the time of the Virginia Tech shooting, the firm operated 50 websites and had 10 employees.

References

Companies based in Green Bay, Wisconsin
Online retailers of the United States
Sporting goods retailers of the United States
American companies established in 1999
Retail companies established in 1999
Internet properties established in 1999
Retail companies disestablished in 2012
1999 establishments in Wisconsin